The 1891 South Molton by-election was held on 13 November 1891 after the incumbent Liberal Unionist MP Newton Wallop was elevated to the peerage.  The election was won by the Liberal candidate, George Lambert who would hold the seat with one short interruption until 1945.

References 

By-elections to the Parliament of the United Kingdom in Devon constituencies
November 1891 events
1891 elections in the United Kingdom
1891 in England
19th century in Devon